A partial solar eclipse will occur on December 27, 2065.

Related eclipses

Solar eclipses 2065–2069

References

External links 

2065 12 27
2065 12 27
2065 in science